Shirin Farhad Ki Toh Nikal Padi is a 2012 Indian Hindi-language romantic comedy film directed by Bela Bhansali Sehgal, starring Farah Khan, Boman Irani, Kavin Dave, Shammi, Kurush Deboo and Daisy Irani. The film takes its inspiration from the Persian poem Farhad and Shirin by Nizami Ganjavi, itself based on a story found in the Shahnameh.

Plot
Farhad Pastakia (Boman Irani) has a dream job as a bra-and-panty salesman. Except that he is a 45-year-old Parsi bachelor still living with his overbearing mother and grandmother. But it’s not like he’s stopped trying. Desperate to get him married, Farhad’s mother drags him to see women and even to embarrassing Parsi matrimony services.

In the midst of all the daily humdrum, Farhad meets the woman of his dreams: Shirin Fugawala (Farah Khan), who drops by his store. Shirin, who works at the Parsi Trust, hits it off with Farhad from the start. Everything seems to be perfect and Farhad gets ready to introduce Shirin to his mother. But mummy becomes the villain in their story when she discovers that Shirin is the devious Parsi Trust Secretary who got the illegal water tank in their home demolished. The water tank being the 'aakhri nishaani' of Farhad’s late father doesn’t help matters.

The ups and downs in Shirin-Farhad’s relationship and how the two try to make it work is the rest of the journey.

Cast
 Boman Irani as Farhad Pastakia
 Farah Khan as Shirin Fuggawala
 Kavin Dave
 Shammi
 Kurush Deboo as Sorab, noisy quarrelsome neighbour of Shirin
 Daisy Irani as Nargis Pastakia
 Dinyar Contractor
 Nauheed Cyrusi as Anahita
 Mahabanoo Modi Kotwal as Dhan Aunty
 Beroze as Farhad's aunt

Soundtrack

The album is composed by Jeet Gannguli.

Release 
Shirin Farhad Ki Toh Nikal Padi was released on 24 August 2012.

Marketing

Critical reception
Shirin Farhad Ki Toh Nikal Padi received positive to mixed critical reactions. Sukanya Verma of Rediff gave the movie 3.5/5, commenting that "Shirin Farhad Ki Toh Nikal Padi certainly makes for a welcome break from farcical exaggerations. What sets this delightful love story apart is that it is woven around two 40-plus Parsis, who neither face the hurdle of age nor community." Rajeev Masand of CNN-IBN gave the movie 3/5, concluding that "Shirin Farhad Ki Toh Nikal Padi is a charming film made with heart. Give it a chance, you won’t be disappointed." Shomini Sen of Zee News gave the movie 3/5, stating that "Shirin Farhad Ki Toh Nikal Padi makes you smile and laugh with each of its characters and their crazy, confusing ways. It will remind you of the bygone era when things were simpler." Aniruddha Guha of DNA India gave the movie 3/5, saying that "Shirin Farhad Ki Toh Nikal Padi demands little of you and delivers enough for you to not grudge spending time and money on it." Aakanksha Naval-Shetye of DNA India gave the movie 3/5, stating that "Shirin Farhad Ki Toh Nikal Padi is too sweet and too simple, but makes for a fun watch." Madhureeta Mukherjee of The Times of India gave the movie 3/5, concluding that "Shirin Farhad Ki Toh Nikal Padi is no epic love tale, but it's worth a watch for those who like their cinema as buttered as their bun maska." Saibal Chatterjee of NDTV gave the movie 2.5/5, commenting that "Shirin Farhad Ki To Nikal Padi is warm-hearted and generally watchable without being exhilarating." Taran Adarsh of Bollywood Hungama gave the movie 3.5/5, saying that "SHIRIN FARHAD KI TOH NIKAL PADI is a simple, unfussy and heartfelt movie that hits the right notes." Salman Khan praised the movie and told at least once it is watchable.

Box office
Shirin Farhad Ki Toh Nikal Padi had a good opening at the box office at 20%, collecting  in its first day. The film collected   nett in week one.

References

External links

2012 films
2010s Hindi-language films
Hindi-language comedy films
Indian comedy films
Films about Zoroastrianism
Films based on poems
Films based on Indian folklore
Films scored by Jeet Ganguly
Works based on Shahnameh
2012 comedy films